Umarga Assembly constituency is one of the 288 Vidhan Sabha (legislative assembly) constituencies of Maharashtra state in western India.

Overview
Umarga (constituency number 240) is one of the four Vidhan Sabha constituencies located in the Osmanabad district. It covers the entire Lohara and Umarga tehsils of this district. It is reserved for the candidates belonging to the Scheduled castes. The number of electors in 2009 was 266,557 (male 140,491, female 126,066).

Umarga is part of the Osmanabad Lok Sabha constituency along with five other Vidhan Sabha segments, namely Paranda, Tuljapur and Osmanabad in Osmanabad district, Barshi in the Solapur district and Ausa in the Latur district.

Members of Legislative Assembly

See also
 List of constituencies of Maharashtra Vidhan Sabha
 Umarga

References

Assembly constituencies of Maharashtra
Osmanabad district